TJ Družstevník Nižný Hrušov is a Slovak football team, based in the town of Nižný Hrušov. The club was founded in 1990.

References

External links 
at futbalvsfz.sk 

Druzstevnik Nizny Hrusov
Association football clubs established in 1990
1990 establishments in Slovakia